Cycling teams sponsored by Fagor include:

 Fagor (cycling team, 1966–1969), known as Fagor from 1966 to 1969
 Mercier (cycling team), known as Fagor–Mercier–Hutchinson in 1970 and 1971
 Fagor (cycling team, 1985–1989), known as Fagor from 1985 to 1989